This is a list of participation by football clubs in Liechtenstein in European competitions.

UEFA Cup/Europa League

UEFA Europa Conference League

Cup Winners' Cup

Records and statistics

UEFA Cup/Europa League

UEFA Europa Conference League

Cup Winners' Cup

Total

References 

 
European football clubs in international competitions